In atmospheric thermodynamics, the virtual temperature of a moist air parcel is the temperature at which a theoretical dry air parcel would have a total pressure and density equal to the moist parcel of air.
The virtual temperature of unsaturated moist air is always greater than the absolute air temperature, however, as the existence of suspended cloud droplets reduces the virtual temperature.

Introduction

Description

In atmospheric thermodynamic processes, it is often useful to assume air parcels behave approximately adiabatically, and approximately ideally.  The specific gas constant for the standardized mass of one kilogram of a particular gas is variable, and described mathematically as

The apparent molar mass of a theoretical moist parcel in Earth's atmosphere can be defined in components of water vapor and dry air as

The total pressure  is described by Dalton's law of partial pressures:

Purpose
Rather than carry out these calculations, it is convenient to scale another quantity within the ideal gas law to equate the pressure and density of a dry parcel to a moist parcel.  The only variable quantity of the ideal gas law independent of density and pressure is temperature.  This scaled quantity is known as virtual temperature, and it allows for the use of the dry-air equation of state for moist air.  Temperature has an inverse proportionality to density.  Thus, analytically, a higher vapor pressure would yield a lower density, which should yield a higher virtual temperature in turn.

Derivation

The density is given by

Rearranging the standard ideal gas equation with these variables gives

 and 

Solving for the densities in each equation and combining with the law of partial pressures yields

where the virtual temperature  is

We now have a non-linear scalar for temperature dependent purely on the unitless value , allowing for varying amounts of water vapor in an air parcel.  This virtual temperature  in units of kelvin can be used seamlessly in any thermodynamic equation necessitating it.

Variations

Often the more easily accessible atmospheric parameter is the mixing ratio .  Through expansion upon the definition of vapor pressure in the law of partial pressures as presented above and the definition of mixing ratio:

which allows

With the mixing ratio  expressed in g/g.

An approximate conversion using  in degrees Celsius and mixing ratio  in g/kg is

Virtual potential temperature 
Virtual potential temperature is similar to potential temperature in that it removes the temperature variation caused by changes in pressure. Virtual potential temperature is useful as a surrogate for density in buoyancy calculations and in turbulence transport which includes vertical air movement.

Uses

Virtual temperature is used in adjusting CAPE soundings for assessing available convective potential energy from skew-T log-P diagrams.  The errors associated with ignoring virtual temperature correction for smaller CAPE values can be quite significant. Thus, in the early stages of convective storm formation, a virtual temperature correction is significant in identifying the potential intensity in tropical cyclogenesis.

The virtual temperature effect is also known as the vapor buoyancy effect and is proposed to increase Earth's thermal emission by warming the tropical atmosphere. The studies were explained by a news article at Phys.org.

Further reading

References

Atmospheric thermodynamics